Elections to Haringey Council were held on 4 May 2006.  The whole council was up for election for the first time since the 2002 election.

Haringey local elections are held every four years, with the next in 2010.

Election result

|}

Results by Ward

Alexandra

Bounds Green

Bruce Grove

Ray Dodds was a sitting councillor for Northumberland Park ward.

Crouch End

Fortis Green

Harringay

Highgate

Hornsey

Erline Prescott was a sitting councillor in West Green ward.

Muswell Hill

Noel Park

Katherine Wynne was a sitting councillor for Stroud Green ward

Northumberland Park

Seven Sisters

St Ann's

Stroud Green

Peter Hillman was a sitting councillor for Tottenham Hale ward

Reginald Rice was a sitting councillor for Tottenham Green ward

Tottenham Green

Tottenham Hale

West Green

White Hart Lane

Woodside

By-Elections

The by-election was called following the resignation of Cllr. Justin Portess.

The by-election was called following the resignation of Cllr. Wayne Hoban.

The by-election was called following the death of Cllr. Frederick A. Knight.

References

Council elections in the London Borough of Haringey
2006 London Borough council elections